Mariel Margaret Hamm-Garciaparra (born March 17, 1972) is an American former professional soccer player, two-time Olympic gold medalist and two-time FIFA Women's World Cup champion. Hailed as a soccer icon, she played as a forward for the United States women's national soccer team from 1987 to 2004.  Hamm was the face of the Women's United Soccer Association (WUSA), the first professional women's soccer league in the United States, where she played for the Washington Freedom from 2001 to 2003. She played college soccer for the North Carolina Tar Heels women's soccer team and helped the team win four NCAA Division I Women's Soccer Championship titles.

During her tenure with the national team, Hamm competed in four FIFA Women's World Cup tournaments: the inaugural 1991 in China, 1995 in Sweden, 1999 and 2003 in the United States. She led the team at three Olympic Games, including: 1996 in Atlanta (the first time women's soccer was played), 2000 in Sydney, and 2004 in Athens. She completed her international career having played in 42 matches and scored 14 goals at these 7 international tournaments.

Hamm held the record for most international goals scored until 2013 and remains in third place behind former teammate Abby Wambach and Canadian striker Christine Sinclair as of 2017. She ranks third in the history of the U.S. national team for international caps (276) and first for career assists (144). Twice named FIFA World Player of the Year in 2001 and 2002, Hamm and her teammate Michelle Akers were hailed by Pelé as two of FIFA's 125 greatest living players when he included them in the FIFA 100 to celebrate the organization's 100th anniversary. Hamm was named U.S. Soccer Female Athlete of the Year five years in a row and won three ESPY awards including Soccer Player of the Year and Female Athlete of the Year. The Women's Sports Foundation named her Sportswoman of the Year in 1997 and 1999. She was inducted into the National Soccer Hall of Fame, Alabama Sports Hall of Fame, Texas Sports Hall of Fame, North Carolina Soccer Hall of Fame, and was the first woman inducted into the World Football Hall of Fame.

A co-owner of Los Angeles FC, Hamm is also a global ambassador for FC Barcelona and is on the board of directors of Serie A club A.S. Roma. Author of Go For the Goal: A Champion's Guide to Winning in Soccer and Life, Hamm has been featured in several films and television shows, including the HBO documentary, Dare to Dream: The Story of the U.S. Women's Soccer Team.

Early life

Born in Selma, Alabama, Hamm was the fourth of six children of Bill and Stephanie Hamm. She wore corrective shoes as a toddler after being born with a club foot. Hamm spent her childhood on various United States Air Force bases around the world with her family. While living in Florence, Italy, Hamm first played soccer, which was hugely popular there; her entire family quickly became involved in the sport. At age five, then living in Wichita Falls, Texas, Hamm joined her first soccer team. Her father coached Mia and her newly adopted brother, 8-year-old Garrett.

Hamm played sports from a young age and excelled as a football player on the boys' team at junior high school. As a high school freshman and sophomore, she played soccer for Notre Dame Catholic High School in Wichita Falls. She played at the 1987 U.S. Olympic Festival, the youngest player to play for the United States women's national soccer team. As a new player, she often started as a forward but did not score a goal during her first year on the team. Hamm spent a year at Lake Braddock Secondary School in Burke, Virginia, and helped the Lake Braddock soccer team win the 1989 state championships.

Club career

North Carolina Tar Heels, 1989–1993
From 1989 to 1993, Hamm attended the University of North Carolina at Chapel Hill, where she helped the Tar Heels win four NCAA Division I Women's Soccer Championships in five years. She red-shirted the 1991 season to focus on preparation for the inaugural 1991 FIFA Women's World Cup in China. North Carolina lost one game of the 95 she played on the team. She earned All-American honors, was named the Atlantic Coast Conference (ACC) Player of the Year for three consecutive years, and was named ACC Female Athlete of the Year in 1993 and 1994. She graduated from North Carolina in 1994 with the ACC records for goals (103), assists (72), and total points (278). In 2003, she and Michael Jordan were named the ACC's Greatest Athletes of the conference's first fifty years.

Hamm was a member of the United States women's national college team that won a silver medal, being defeated by China in the final, at the 1993 Summer Universiade in Buffalo, New York.

Washington Freedom, 2001–2003
In 2001, Hamm was a founding player in the first professional women's soccer league in the United States, the Women's United Soccer Association (WUSA), and played for the Washington Freedom from 2001 to 2003. Throughout the league's history, Hamm was hailed as the star of the league and used heavily in marketing and promotion. In a poll of 1,000 advertising executives conducted in 2001, she was voted "the most appealing female athlete", garnering almost twice as many votes as the runner-up Anna Kournikova.

During the league's inaugural match between the Freedom and Bay Area CyberRays at RFK Stadium in Washington, D.C., Hamm was fouled in the penalty area resulting in a penalty kick that her teammate Pretinha converted to mark the first goal scored in the league. The Freedom won 1–0. In addition to the 34,148 fans in attendance being greater than any MLS game that weekend, the Turner Network Television (TNT) broadcast reached 393,087 households: more than two MLS games broadcast on ESPN and ESPN2. Playing as a midfielder and forward, Hamm played in 19 of the Freedom's 21 matches during the 2001 season. She led the team in goals (6) and assists (4).
The Freedom finished in seventh place during the regular season with a  record.

Hamm suffered a knee injury in November 2001 that kept her off the pitch for several months of early 2002. Despite playing only half the 2002 season with the Freedom, she finished the season with eight goals.  The team finished in third place during the 2002 season with a  record and advanced to the playoffs. After winning the semi-final against the Philadelphia Charge 1–0, the team was defeated 3–2 by the Carolina Courage in the 2002 WUSA Founders Cup. Hamm scored the Freedom's second goal in the 64th minute.

During the 2003 season, Hamm started in 16 of the 19 games in which she played. Her 11 goals ranked second on the team behind Abby Wambach's 13 while her 11 assists ranked first.
The Freedom finished in fourth place during the regular season with a  record and secured a berth in the playoffs. Hamm finished her club career as a WUSA champion when the Freedom defeated the Atlanta Beat 2–1 in overtime to win the Founders Cup on August 24, 2003.

Retirement
On May 14, 2004, Hamm announced her retirement effective after the 2004 Athens Olympics. Following the 2004 Olympics, Hamm and her teammates played in a 10-game farewell tour in the United States. The final match of the tour against Mexico at the Home Depot Center in Carson, California, on December 8, 2004, marked the final international match for Hamm, Julie Foudy, and Joy Fawcett. The U.S. defeated Mexico 5–0 and Hamm assisted on two of the goals.

Hamm retired at age 32 with a record 158 international goals. She and teammates Foudy and Fawcett were honored with a pre-game ceremony where they were presented with framed jerseys and roses in front of 15,549 fans at Home Depot Center in Carson, California. During the 5–0 win against Mexico, Hamm provided the assist on the first two goals. Following her retirement, Hamm's #9 jersey was inherited by midfielder Heather O'Reilly.

International career

Women's national team, 1987–2004
Hamm made her debut for the United States women's national soccer team in 1987 at the age of 15 — just two years after the team played its first international match. She was the youngest person ever to play for the team. She scored her first goal during her 17th appearance. She competed in four FIFA Women's World Cup tournaments: the inaugural 1991 in China, 1995 in Sweden, 1999 and 2003 in the United States. She led the team at three Olympic Games, including: 1996 in Atlanta (the first time women's soccer was played), 2000 in Sydney, and 2004 in Athens. In total, she played 42 matches and scored 14 goals in international tournaments.

Hamm held the record for most international goals scored—by a woman or man—until 2013 and remains in third place as of 2017. She ranks third in the history of the U.S. national team for international caps (276) and first for career assists (144).

1991 FIFA Women's World Cup 

In 1991, Hamm was named to the roster for the inaugural FIFA Women's World Cup in China under North Carolina coach Anson Dorrance. At 19 years old, she was still the youngest player on the team. During the team's first match of the tournament, Hamm scored the game-winning goal in the 62nd minute, leading the U.S. to a 3–2 win over Sweden. She also scored once in their second group stage match when they defeated Brazil 5–0. The U.S. squad finished first in Group B after a third win against Japan on November 21 and advanced to the knockout stage of the tournament. During the quarterfinal match, the U. S. defeated Chinese Taipei 7–0. After defeating Germany 5–2 during the semi-final, the U.S. faced Norway in the final. In front of 63,000 spectators, the U.S. clinched the first World Cup championship title after a 2–1 win.

1995 FIFA Women's World Cup 
Hamm's second World Cup appearance came during the 1995 tournament in Sweden. The United States were led by head coach Tony DiCicco. During the team's first match of the tournament, she scored the team's third goal in the 51st minute in a 3–3 draw against China PR. The U.S. faced Denmark during its second group stage match. Goals from Kristine Lilly and Tiffeny Milbrett led to a 2–0 win for the U.S. Hamm played goalkeeper for a few minutes after Briana Scurry received a red card and was removed from the match. After defeating Australia 4–1 on June, 10, the U.S. advanced to the knock-out stage and defeated Japan 4–0 in the quarter-final. The U.S. was defeated by eventual champion Norway 1–0 in the semi-finals and captured third place after defeating China PR 2–0 on June 17. Hamm scored the second U.S. goal of the match in the 55th minute.

1996–1998: Atlanta Olympics and 100th international goal 
Hamm was a key part of the U.S. team at the 1996 Summer Olympic Games in Atlanta; this was the first Olympic tournament to include women's soccer. The U.S. faced Denmark in their first preliminary round match. Hamm scored a goal and served an assist to Tiffeny Milbrett to lead the U.S. to a 3–0 win. The team defeated Sweden 2–1 next at the Orlando Citrus Bowl. After tying China 0–0 in their final preliminary round match, the U.S. finished second in Group E. Defeating Norway in the semi-finals, the team faced China in the final. Hamm played despite having foot and groin injuries, suffered during team training and the match against Sweden. Although she was carried off by stretcher in the final minute, her team won their first Olympic gold medal with a 2–1 win witnessed by 76,481 fans in the stadium – the largest crowd for a soccer event in the history of the Olympics and the largest crowd for a women's sports event in the United States.

The 20 goals scored by Hamm in 1998 were the highest annual total of her international career. She also provided 20 assists. On September 18, she scored her 100th international goal in a friendly match against Russia in Rochester, New York. The same year, she led the U.S. to the first-ever Goodwill Games gold medal. Hamm scored five of the team's seven goals at the tournament, including two during the championship match against China.

1999: 108th International goal and FIFA Women's World Cup 

On May 22, 1999, Hamm broke the all-time international goal record with her 108th goal in a game against Brazil in Orlando, Florida. The following month, she led the national team at the 1999 FIFA Women's World Cup, hosted by the United States. During the team's first group stage match against Denmark, she scored her 110th international goal and served an assist to Julie Foudy as the U.S. won 3–0. Against Nigeria, Hamm's low free kick was knocked into the goal by a Nigerian midfielder. Within a minute, Hamm scored with a free kick. She later served an assist to Kristine Lilly before being substituted in the 57th minute. The U.S. won 7–1 and secured a berth in the quarter-finals. During the team's final group stage match, head coach Tony DiCicco rested a number of players, including Hamm, who was substituted at half-time. The U.S. defeated Korea 3–0 and finished Group A with nine points. In the quarter-finals, the U.S. defeated Germany 3–2. Playing Brazil in the semi-finals, Hamm was knocked down in the penalty area late in the second half; Michelle Akers converted the subsequent penalty and their team won 2–0.

After 90 minutes of scoreless regulation time and 30 minutes of sudden death, the 1999 FIFA Women's World Cup Final was decided by a penalty shootout between the U.S. and China. The five American players to take penalty kicks, including Hamm, converted; China missed one attempt so that the home team won. The final surpassed the 1996 Atlanta Olympic final as the most-attended women's sports event, with more than 90,000 people filling the Rose Bowl in Pasadena, California. It held the record until 2014 for the largest U.S. television audience for a soccer match with 17,975,000 viewers. , it ranks third following the 2015 FIFA Women's World Cup (25,400,000 viewers) and 2014 FIFA World Cup group stage match between the U.S. men's team and Portugal (18,220,000 viewers).

Immediately following the final, Hamm collapsed in the locker room from severe dehydration. She was treated by medical staff with an intravenous drip and three liters of fluids. After 12 hours of sleep, she joined the team for magazine cover shoots, went to Disneyland for a celebration rally, and made numerous television appearances. A week later, the team met President Clinton at the White House and flew with Hillary and Chelsea Clinton on Air Force One to Cape Canaveral. Her leadership and performance at the 1999 World Cup cemented Hamm as a soccer icon.

2000 Sydney Olympics 
Hamm represented the United States at the 2000 Summer Olympics in Sydney, Australia. During the group stage, she scored a goal against Norway to lift the United States to a 2–0 win. The team tied China 1–1 in their next group stage match before defeating Nigeria 3–1 to finish first in their group. After advancing to the semi-finals where the U.S. faced Brazil, Hamm scored the game-winning goal in the 60th minute. The goal marked the 127th of her international career and set a new record for most goals scored in international play by a woman or man. The U.S. faced Norway in the final and were defeated 3–2 in overtime to earn the silver medal at the Games.

2003 FIFA Women's World Cup 

Originally scheduled for China, the 2003 FIFA Women's World Cup was moved to the United States due to the SARS outbreak. Hamm was named to the U.S. roster in August, and stated that it would be her final World Cup appearance. During the team's first group stage match, Hamm's three assists helped the U.S. to a 3–1 win over Sweden. She scored twice against Nigeria and served the assist for the team's third goal to lead the U.S. to a 5–0 win and qualification for the quarter-finals with one match to play. The U.S. faced North Korea in their final group stage match and dominated 3–0. Hamm and a number of others were rested for the game by head coach April Heinrichs; this was the first World Cup match Hamm had missed in her career. The U.S. faced Norway in the quarter-finals; Although the U.S. won 1–0, Hamm was fouled throughout the match as Norway played with physicality to counter the U.S. team. One of Norway's 24 fouls resulted in a penalty kick for Hamm which was saved by the Norwegian goalkeeper. After the U.S. was defeated 3–0 by Germany in the semi-finals, the team defeated Canada 3–1 to secure a third-place finish.

2004: 158th international goal and Athens Olympics 
During a friendly game against Australia on July 21, 2004, Hamm scored her 158th international goal setting the record for most international goals scored by any player in the world, male or female. She held the world record until Abby Wambach scored her 159th goal on June 20, 2013. The Australia match also marked Hamm's 259th international appearance; only two of her teammates, Kristine Lilly and Christie Rampone, have played in more international games.

Hamm helped lead the U.S. national team to its second gold medal at the 2004 Summer Olympics in Athens and was selected by her fellow Olympians to carry the American flag at the closing ceremony. During the team's first group stage match against Greece, Hamm served the cross to Shannon Boxx's game-opening goal, and scored the last goal of the match to lift the U.S. to a 3–0 win. During a 2–0 win over Brazil in the second group stage match, Hamm converted a penalty kick for the opening goal. The U.S. finished at the top of Group C with seven points after a 1–1 draw against Australia to advance to the quarter-finals, where they defeated Japan 2–1. During the semi-final match against Germany, Hamm served an assist to Heather O'Reilly who scored in overtime to secure a 2–1 win. The U.S. faced Brazil for a second time at the Games in the gold medal match and won 2–1 in overtime. Her teammates swarmed Hamm after the final whistle to celebrate their second Olympic gold medal and her final win at the Olympics. The game marked the last Olympic appearance for the five remaining players who had helped win the inaugural 1991 FIFA Women's World Cup: Hamm, Julie Foudy, Joy Fawcett, Brandi Chastain, and Kristine Lilly (often referred to as the Fab Five).

Style of play
Regarded as one of the greatest women soccer players of all time, Hamm was an athletic, dynamic, and technically gifted striker, renowned for her speed, skill, footwork, stamina, and ability on the ball, as well as her consistency. An excellent, agile dribbler, she was highly regarded for her control, as well as her grace, pace, and elegance in possession. A prolific goalscorer, she was known for her powerful and accurate striking ability, although she was also a creative and hard-working forward, and a team player, who was equally capable of assisting many goals for her teammates, due to her accurate passing, and was also willing to aid her teammates defensively when possession was lost. She was capable of playing in any offensive position.

Personal life

Hamm was first married to her college sweetheart Christiaan Corry, a United States Marine Corps helicopter pilot; they divorced in 2001 after being married six years. She married then-Boston Red Sox shortstop Nomar Garciaparra on November 22, 2003, in Goleta, California, in a ceremony attended by a few hundred guests. On March 27, 2007, Hamm gave birth to twin girls, Grace Isabella and Ava Caroline. The couple had a son, named Garrett Anthony, in January 2012.

Philanthropy 

In 1999, Hamm founded the Mia Hamm Foundation following the death of her adopted brother Garrett in 1997 from complications of aplastic anemia, a rare blood disease he had endured for ten years. Dedicated to promoting awareness of and raising funds for families in need of a bone marrow or cord blood transplant, the foundation encourages people to register in the national bone marrow registry and provides funds to UNC Health Care and Children's Hospital Los Angeles. It also focuses on creating opportunities to empower women through sport. Hamm hosts an annual celebrity soccer game in Los Angeles to support the foundation.

In popular culture 

Hamm has been called the most marketable female athlete of her generation. During her time as an international soccer player, she signed endorsement deals with Gatorade, Nike, Dreyer's Ice Cream, Pepsi, Nabisco, Fleet Bank, Earthgrains, and Powerbar. In 1997, she starred in a popular commercial for Pert Plus. Hamm was featured on a Wheaties box following the 1999 World Cup and endorsed the first Soccer Barbie by Mattel. She co-starred with Michael Jordan in a popular television commercial for Gatorade in the spring of 1999 which featured the two athletes competing against each other in a variety of sports while the song Anything You Can Do (I Can Do Better) is heard. The commercial ends with Hamm throwing Jordan to the ground in a judo match. In 2000, the video game, Mia Hamm Soccer 64 was released for Nintendo 64. It was the first game to feature female athletes only and sold a "relatively high" 42,886 copies in the United States.

Hamm was featured on the covers of Sports Illustrated, Time, and People. She has made appearances on numerous television shows, including: Late Night with David Letterman,  The Rosie O'Donnell Show, The Tonight Show with Jay Leno, Today, Extreme Makeover: Home Edition, Good Morning America, and The Oprah Winfrey Show. She was profiled in ESPN's SportsCentury and Biography documentaries, ESPN 25: Who's #1?, and was featured in Once in a Lifetime: The Extraordinary Story of the New York Cosmos.  In 2005, she was featured in the HBO documentary Dare to Dream: The Story of the U.S. Women's Soccer Team. Her likeness was used in the logo of Women's Professional Soccer, the second women's professional soccer league in the United States. Hamm was mentioned on a season eight episode of the TV series Friends. When Rachel had Joey put his hand on her belly, she says, "Aw, it's unbelievable! Wow! She is kicking so much! Oh, she's like, um, who's that kind of annoying girl soccer player?" Joey asks, "Mia Hamm?" Rachel says, "Mia Hamm!".

Other work

Hamm is a global ambassador for FC Barcelona. She is the author of the national bestseller Go For the Goal: A Champion's Guide to Winning in Soccer and Life and juvenile fiction book Winners Never Quit.

In 2012, after Pia Sundhage's departure as head coach of the national team, Hamm joined Danielle Slaton and Sunil Gulati as a member of the search committee for Sundhage's successor. In 2014, she was named to the board of the National Soccer Hall of Fame.

In October 2014, Hamm was announced as a co-owner of the future Major League Soccer team, Los Angeles FC. The same month, Hamm joined the board of directors of Serie A club A.S. Roma, owned by American investors. Hamm joined Vice President Joe Biden and Second Lady Jill Biden as members of the United States delegation at the 2015 FIFA Women's World Cup Final in Vancouver, Canada.

Career statistics

Matches and goals scored at World Cup and Olympic tournaments
Hamm competed as a member of the United States national soccer team in four FIFA Women's World Cup tournaments: the inaugural 1991 in China, 1995 in Sweden, as well as 1999 and 2003 in the United States. She competed at three Summer Olympic Games: 1996 in Atlanta, 2000 in Sydney, and 2004 in Athens. All together, she played in 38 matches and scored 13 goals at seven top international tournaments. With her teammates, Hamm finished third at two World Cup tournaments in 1995 and 2003, second at the 2000 Olympics, and first at the four other international tournaments.

International goals

Honors and awards

Hamm was named Sportswoman of the Year by the Women's Sports Foundation in 1997 and 1999.  In June 1999, Nike named the largest building on their corporate campus after Hamm. In December 2000, Hamm was named one of the top three female soccer players of the twentieth century in the FIFA Female Player of the Century Award, finishing behind only Sun Wen and compatriot Michelle Akers.

While at North Carolina, she won the Honda Sports Award as the nation's top female soccer player in both 1993 and 1994, and won the Honda-Broderick Cup in 1994 as the nation's top female athlete.

In March 2004, Hamm and former U.S. teammate Michelle Akers were the only two women and Americans named to the FIFA 100, a list of the 125 greatest living soccer players, selected by Pelé and commissioned by FIFA for the organization's 100th anniversary. Other accolades include being elected U.S. Soccer Female Athlete of the Year five years in a row from 1994 to 1998, and winning three ESPY awards including Soccer Player of the Year and Female Athlete of the Year.

In 2006 Hamm was inducted into the Alabama Sports Hall of Fame, followed by the Texas Sports Hall of Fame on March 11, 2008. In 2007, during her first year of eligibility, Hamm was selected for induction into the National Soccer Hall of Fame. In 2008, an image of her silhouette was used in the logo for the second professional women's soccer league in the United States: Women's Professional Soccer. ESPN named her the greatest female athlete in 2012.

In 2013, Hamm became the first woman inducted into the World Football Hall of Fame, located in Pachuca, Mexico. She was named to U.S. Soccer's USWNT All-Time Best XI in December 2013. In 2014, Hamm was named one of ESPNW's Impact 25; she was also the recipient of the Golden Foot Legends Award.

For their first match of March 2019, the women of the United States women's national soccer team each wore a jersey with the name of a woman they were honoring on the back; Samantha Mewis chose the name of Hamm.

In 2021, Hamm was inducted into the National Women's Hall of Fame.

In 2022, Los Angeles F.C. of Major League Soccer - of which Hamm is part owner - won the MLS Cup, thus giving Hamm an MLS championship to her credit

Championships

See also

 List of FIFA Women's World Cup winning players
 List of women's footballers with 100 or more international goals
 List of University of North Carolina at Chapel Hill Olympians
 List of Olympic medalists in football
 List of 1996 Summer Olympics medal winners
 List of 2000 Summer Olympics medal winners
 List of 2004 Summer Olympics medal winners
 List of athletes on Wheaties boxes

References 

Match reports

External links

 
 
 
 
 Mia Hamm  Video produced by Makers: Women Who Make America
 

1972 births
Living people
Sportspeople from Selma, Alabama
Soccer players from Alabama
Soccer players from North Carolina
American women's soccer players
Women's association football forwards
Women's association football midfielders
North Carolina Tar Heels women's soccer players
Hermann Trophy women's winners
Washington Freedom players
Women's United Soccer Association players
United States women's international soccer players
1991 FIFA Women's World Cup players
1995 FIFA Women's World Cup players
Footballers at the 1996 Summer Olympics
1999 FIFA Women's World Cup players
Footballers at the 2000 Summer Olympics
2003 FIFA Women's World Cup players
Footballers at the 2004 Summer Olympics
Outfield association footballers who played in goal
FIFA Women's World Cup-winning players
Olympic gold medalists for the United States in soccer
Olympic silver medalists for the United States in soccer
Medalists at the 1996 Summer Olympics
Medalists at the 2000 Summer Olympics
Medalists at the 2004 Summer Olympics
FIFA Century Club
FIFA World Player of the Year winners
National Soccer Hall of Fame members
FIFA 100
Women association football executives
American expatriate sportspeople in Italy
American women philanthropists
Philanthropists from Alabama
Philanthropists from North Carolina
Competitors at the 1998 Goodwill Games